Robert Pehrsson (born December 13, 1975) is a Swedish guitarist, singer & song writer. He has worked for such diverse bands such as Runemagick, Thunder Express, Death Breath, Dundertåget, Imperial State Electric, Slingblade and also Dagger. Robert Pehrsson started his career as a guitarist/vocalist around 88–89, then concentrating mainly on playing extreme music like thrash and early death metal, but soon branched out in different musical genres but mainly focusing on rock music.

Pehrsson has now completed his first (solo) album for High Roller Records containing songs such as the guitar-driven "Haunt My Mind", "Who Else Is on Your Mind" or the soft rockin' "Can't Change".

Recorded at Gutterview Recorders, the nine songs feature guest spots by well-known musicians such as Nicke Andersson, Dolf De Borst and Tomas Eriksson from Imperial State Electric, Peter Stjärnvind (Nifelheim, Black Trip), Joseph Tholl (Enforcer, Black Trip), Robert Eriksson (ex The Hellacopters), Olle Dahlstedt (Entombed), Johan Bäckman (Necrocourse) and Johannes Borgström.

Musical equipment
Guitars

Gibson Flying V
Gibson SG
Gibson Les Paul Sunburst
Gibson Les Paul Tobacco Burst
Greco Les Paul Tobacco Burst
Fender Telecaster

Effects

BOSS TU-2 Tuner
Dunlop Cry Baby
Dunlop Rotovibe
MXR Bass Octave Deluxe
Fulltone Fat-Boost
Electro Harmonix LPB-1
MXR Micro Amp
Custom built Tube screamer
MXR Phase 90
MXR Flanger
MXR Analog Delay
Custom built Echo Delay

'Amps & Cabinets

Marshall JMP100 Head
Vox AC30
Orange 4x12 Cabinet
Malmberg 4x12 Cabinet
Custom 2x12 Cabinet

Discography
1996 – Deathwitch – Triumphant Devastation 1997 – Deathwitch – Dawn of Armageddon 1999 – Tomahawk – What to Do 7"1999 – Tomahawk – Push 7"2002 – Wrecks – Wrecks2004 – Thunder Express – We Play for Pleasure2006 – Death Breath – Death Breath2006 – Death Breath – Stinking Up the Night2007 – Thunder Express – Republic Disgrace2007 – Death Breath – Let It Stink2009 – Dundertåget – Skaffa ny frisyr2010 – Dundertåget – Dom feta åren är förbi2010 – Imperial State Electric – Imperial State Electric 2012 – Imperial State Electric – Pop War2013 – Robert Pehrsson's Humbucker – S/T (Solo album)2013 – Imperial State Electric – Reptile Brain MusicTBA – Death Breath – TBA
2015 - Imperial State Electric - Honk Machine'
2016 - Robert Pehrsson's Humbucker - Long Way To The Light

Appearing on
 2009 – Mary's Kids – S/T
 2010 – Necronaut – S/T
 2011 – 77 – High Decibels
 2011 – Slingblade – The Unpredicted Deeds of Molly Black 
 2012 – The Datsuns – Death Rattle Boogie
 2012  – Bullet – Full Pull
 2012 – Mary's Kids – Say No!
 2013 – Black Trip – Goin' Under
 2013 – Dead Lord – Goodbye Repentance
 2013 – Dregen – S/T
 2013 - Black Trip - Goin' Under
 2015 - Black Trip - Shadowline

Bands
Masticator
Runemagick
Deathwitch
Tomahawk
The Preachermen
Wrecks
Thunder Express/Dundertåget
Death Breath
Imperial State Electric
 Dagger
Robert Pehrsson's Humbucker

References

Thunder Express cuttingedgerocks.com
Karin Larsson Hellacopters efter Hellacopters corren.se
Manoc Death Breath interview gang-bang.gr
Frank Stöver Death Breath voicesfromthedarkside.de
Ryan Englund Taking Bad Breath to New Heights! shop.relapse.com

External links 
 Robert Pehrsson's Humbucker
 Official Dunder Tåget Website
 Official Death Breath Website

Swedish male musicians
1975 births
Living people
Swedish heavy metal guitarists
Death Breath members